Between Night and Dawn is a 1931 German drama film directed by Gerhard Lamprecht and starring Aud Egede-Nissen, Oskar Homolka, and Eduard von Winterstein. The film's sets were designed by the art director Otto Moldenhauer. It is a remake of the 1927 silent film Tragedy of the Street starring Asta Nielsen. It was originally intended she should reprise her role for the sound remake, but was ultimately replaced by the Norwegian actress Aud Egede-Nissen. The film premiered at the Gloria-Palast in Berlin.

Cast
Aud Egede-Nissen as Emma, the prostitute
Oskar Homolka as Anton, her pimp
Dorit Ina as Clarissa, the chanson singer
Rolf von Goth as Paul, young man
Eduard von Winterstein as father
Olga Limburg as mother
Bernhard Goetzke as Louis, pimp
Gerhard Dammann as Ede, a crook
Maria Forescu as Anita
Hilde Schevior as Fritzi
Ilse Baerwald as Lissi
Rudolf Biebrach as the host of the Bimbam
Ernst Behmer as the fur trader
Eugen Rex as Der Wurstmaxe
Edit Angold as female concierge

See also
Tragedy of the Street (1927)

References

External links

1931 drama films
German drama films
Films of the Weimar Republic
Films directed by Gerhard Lamprecht
German films based on plays
Films about prostitution in Germany
Remakes of German films
Sound film remakes of silent films
German black-and-white films
1930s German films
1930s German-language films